Denan Kemp is an Australian former professional rugby league footballer who played in the 2000s and 2010s in the National Rugby League (NRL). He played in the NRL for the Brisbane Broncos, the New Zealand Warriors and the St George Illawarra Dragons. He also had a brief stint in rugby union in 2011, playing for Southern Districts in the Shute Shield competition. Post football, Kemp has launched his own podcast and beer.

Early years
Kemp attended St Michael's College, Merrimac. Kemp went on to play rugby league with the Brisbane Wests in the Queensland Cup before joining Brisbane Broncos feeder club, the Toowoomba Clydesdales. He then was transferred to the Aspley Broncos in 2007 by the Brisbane Broncos.

Brisbane
Kemp made his first grade debut for the Broncos in round 10 of the 2007 NRL season, against the Manly-Warringah Sea Eagles. During the game Kemp scored an individual 75 metre try. This try was voted as the third best of the 2007 NRL season by NRL.com.

In 2008, Kemp started the season strongly coming up with four tries in his first three games. He went on to play 24 games for the club in 2008. In round 12 he scored 4 tries while playing against the Parramatta Eels, equaling a club record set by Lote Tuqiri and Steve Renouf. The record came just hours after he had announced that he was joining the New Zealand Warriors for the 2009 season. When not selected for the first grade side, Kemp turned out for the Norths Devils in the Queensland Cup.

Kemp was Brisbane's top try-scorer in 2008 and was named the club's rookie of the year.

New Zealand Warriors
On 28 May 2008, the New Zealand Warriors announced that they had signed Kemp for the 2009 and 2010 seasons. Whilst at the Warriors he took on goal-kicking responsibilities for the club for the first half of the 2009 season.

In round 2 of the 2009 season, Kemp kicked the match winning conversion from the sideline to defeat the Manly-Warringah Sea Eagles with 28 seconds left. However, for much of the season Kemp could not break into the first grade side, instead he was assigned to Otahuhu and played for the Auckland Vulcans in the NSW Cup. Near the end of the season he asked for a release so he could return to Queensland to rebuild his National Rugby League career. Kemp played in eleven games for the Warriors, scoring 46 points. 2009 was also the first year Kemp was featured on NRL cards, featuring in both Select & Daily Telegraph sets.

Second stint with Brisbane
On 16 September 2009, Kemp announced that he re-signed with the Brisbane Broncos for the 2010 NRL season, after being granted an early release from the final year of his contract with the Warriors. Unfortunately, an injury prevented him from claiming a full-time spot in the first grade side. In round 1 2010, against the North Queensland Cowboys, he scored the final try which won the game for the Broncos 30-24. He played for the Wynnum Manly Seagulls in the 2011 Queensland Cup, before joining the Australian Rugby Union in April 2011.

Rugby union
In April 2011 Kemp signed a contract with the Australian Rugby Union and was a part of the Australian Sevens squad that traveled to London for the IRB Sevens.

Kemp turned out during the 2011 season for the Southern Districts Rugby Club side in Sydney's Shute Shield.

St George Illawarra
On 20 November 2011, Kemp signed for one year with the St George Illawarra Dragons in 2012.
Kemp played in the 2012 Charity Shield game for the Dragons, but never took the field in a first-grade game, as he was mainly relegated to the club's NSW Cup side, the Illawarra Cutters.

Third stint with Brisbane
On 18 January 2013, Kemp signed a one-year deal to return to the Broncos in hopes of another revival of his career. However, he failed to play a single game for the Broncos throughout the entire 2013 NRL season, and was released at the season's end.

Media and Post Rugby League
Since Kemp's retirement from Rugby League at the end of 2013, he has built a popular Rugby League Facebook Page and Podcast known as 'The Locker Room'. Kemp launched 'The Locker Room' podcast on June 9, 2015 with popular rugby league star Beau Ryan. Kemp has also launched a beer brand 'Bloke in a Bar' across Australia which was successfully launched during the COVID-19 pandemic.

References

1987 births
Living people
Sportspeople from the Gold Coast, Queensland
Auckland rugby league team players
Australia international rugby sevens players
Australian rugby league players
Australian rugby union players
Brisbane Broncos players
Illawarra Cutters players
Male rugby sevens players
New Zealand Warriors players
Norths Devils players
Otahuhu Leopards players
Redcliffe Dolphins players
Rugby league fullbacks
Rugby league players from Gold Coast, Queensland
Rugby league wingers
Rugby union players from Queensland
Toowoomba Clydesdales players
Wests Panthers players
Wynnum Manly Seagulls players